Athena Michailidou (1918 - 9 December 2001) was a Greek actress. She appeared in more than thirty films from 1958 to 1982.

Selected filmography

References

External links 

1918 births
2001 deaths
Greek film actresses
Actresses from Athens
People from Syros